Simon is an electronic game of short-term memory skill invented by Ralph H. Baer and Howard J. Morrison, working for toy design firm Marvin Glass and Associates, with software programming by Lenny Cope. The device creates a series of tones and lights and requires a user to repeat the sequence. If the user succeeds, the series becomes progressively longer and more complex. Once the user fails or the time limit runs out, the game is over. The original version was manufactured and distributed by Milton Bradley and later by Hasbro after it took over Milton Bradley. Much of the assembly language code was written by Charles Kapps, who taught computer science at Temple University and also wrote one of the first books on the theory of computer programming. Simon was launched in 1978 at Studio 54 in New York City and was an immediate success, becoming a pop culture symbol of the 1970s and 1980s.

History
Ralph H. Baer and Howard J. Morrison were introduced to Atari's arcade game Touch Me at the Music Operators of America (MOA) trade show in 1976. Baer said of the product, "Nice gameplay. Terrible execution. Visually boring. Miserable, rasping sounds." The prototype built by Baer used the low-cost Texas Instruments TMS 1000 microcontroller chip, which was in many games of the 1970s. Lenny Cope, who was one of Ralph H. Baer's partners, programmed the core of the game, titled Follow Me at the time. Baer developed the tones of the game, inspired by the notes of a bugle. When they pitched the demo, an 8-by-8-inch console, to the Milton Bradley Company the name of the game was changed to Simon. Simon debuted in 1978 at a retail price of $24.95 and became one of the top-selling toys that Christmas shopping season. : "Microcomputer controlled game", was granted in 1980. Milton Bradley soon capitalized on the original with both the smaller-sized Pocket Simon and the expanded, eight-button Super Simon.

Many variants of Simon have been made since Hasbro acquired Milton Bradley in the 1980s, building on the possibilities offered by advances in technology. The original Super Simon was reinvented in 2003 as a hexagonal unit with six buttons, which was only released in Europe. 2000 saw Simon Squared (or Simon2), a unit with the four traditional buttons on one side, and a set of eight smaller buttons on the other. In 2004, Hasbro released the Simon Stix. The game features two electronic sticks (modeled after drumsticks), an emphasis on the musical part of the game, and features four levels of play.

In 2005, Hasbro released Simon Trickster (also known as Simon Tricks in Europe and in the UK, and as Simon Genius in Brazil), which features four game modes, in a similar fashion to another Hasbro game, Bop It, and colored lenses instead of buttons. "Simon Classic" mode plays up to 35 tones (notes). "Simon Bounce" is similar to "Simon Classic", but instead the colors of the lenses change. "Simon Surprise" is one of the most difficult games in the unit. Every lens becomes the same color and the player has to memorize the location. "Simon Rewind" requires the player to memorize the sequence backwards. During each game, the player is paid a compliment after a certain number of tones is completed. On reaching five and eleven tones, the computer will randomly choose "Awesome!", "Nice!", "Sweet!" or "Respect!". On reaching 18 tones, the game will play a victory melody three times. On reaching the ultimate 35 tones, the game will play the victory melody again and will say "Respect!". If the player fails to memorize the pattern or fails to press the right color within the time limit, the game will play a crashing sound and the game will say "Later!".

In 2011, Hasbro introduced Simon Flash. In this version, the game is played with four cube-shaped electronic modules that the player must move around depending on the game mode.

In 2013, Hasbro reinvented Simon once again with Simon Swipe. The game was demonstrated at the New York Toy Fair 2014 and released that summer. The game is a circular unit that looks like a steering wheel. It has been extended from four buttons to eight touchscreen buttons, which are flattened out on the unit. The game features four game modes, called "Levels" (the main game), "Classic", "Party" and "Extreme". The player has to go through all sixteen levels to beat the game. "Classic", "Party" and "Extreme" levels focus on one pattern getting longer and longer until the player is out. A smaller version of the game, called Simon Micro Series, was introduced in the fall of 2014. This version has only two game modes called "Solo" and "Pass It" and features 14 levels and four buttons. There is also a version of Simon created by Basic Fun known as the Touch Simon. This version has an LCD screen and plays melodies at specific parts of the game.

In 2016, Hasbro launched the follow-up to Simon Swipe with Simon Air. The game was announced at a Hasbro press conference before the 2016 New York Toy Fair. This version of Simon uses motion sensors, similar to those in Mattel's Loopz line of games. The game has three game modes: "Solo", "Classic" and "Multiplayer". A button-pressing version of Simon was also released in the US, with an aesthetic recalling that of the 1970s and 1980s models. Recently, Hasbro has released Simon Optix, a headset game with a motion sensor technology similar to Simon Air.

Gameplay
The device has four colored buttons, each producing a particular tone when it is pressed or activated by the device. A round in the game consists of the device lighting up one or more buttons in a random order, after which the player must reproduce that order by pressing the buttons. As the game progresses, the number of buttons to be pressed increases. (This is only one of the games on the device; there are actually other games on the original.)

Simon is named after the simple children's game of Simon Says, but the gameplay is based on Atari's unpopular Touch Me arcade game from 1974. Simon differs from Touch Me in that the Touch Me buttons were all of the same color (black) and the sounds it produced were harsh and grating.

Simon'''s tones, on the other hand, were designed to always be harmonic, no matter the sequence, and consisted of an A major triad in second inversion, resembling a trumpet fanfare:
 E (blue, lower right);
 C♯ (yellow, lower left);
 A (red, upper right).
 E (green, upper left, an octave lower than blue);

Some of the original 1978 models used an alternative set of tones, forming the B♭ minor triad:
 B♭ (blue, lower right);
 C♯ (yellow, lower left);
 F (red, upper right).
 B♭ (green, upper left, an octave higher than blue);Simon was later re-released by Milton Bradley – now owned by Hasbro – in its original circular form, though with a translucent case rather than plain black. It was also sold as a two-sided Simon Squared version, with the reverse side having eight buttons for head-to-head play, and as a keychain (officially licensed by Fun4All) with simplified gameplay (only having Game 1, Difficulty 4 available). Other variations of the original game, no longer produced, include Pocket Simon and the eight-button Super Simon, both from 1980. Nelsonic released an official wristwatch version of Simon.

Later versions of the game included a pocket version of the original game in a smaller, yellow, oval-shaped case. Another iteration, Simon Trickster, plays the original game as well as variations in which the colors shift around from button to button (Simon Bounce), the buttons have no colors at all (Simon Surprise) and the player must repeat the sequence backwards (Simon Rewind). A pocket version of Simon Trickster was also produced.

In the 2014 version of Simon called Simon Swipe, the notes are as follows: 
 G-note (blue, lower right);
 C-note (yellow, lower left);
 E-note (red, upper right).
 G-note (green, upper left, an octave higher than blue)

The swiping sounds are presented with sliding between notes. The bigger the slide, the bigger the swipe will be. The exact notes and sound effects were also used for a smaller version called Simon Micro Series. The sounds were then recreated for Simon Air and Simon Optix.

Clones
As a popular game, Simon inspired many imitators and knockoffs. Atari released a handheld version of Touch Me in 1978, with multicolored buttons and pleasant musical tones. Though named for the older arcade game, the handheld Touch Me contained Simon's three game variations and four difficulty levels, albeit with limits of 8, 16, 32 and 99 instead of 8, 14, 20 and 31. Even its button layout mirrored that of Simon (though upside-down), with blue in the upper left, yellow in the upper right, red in the lower left and green in the lower right. Its only unique features were an LED score display, similar to that of its arcade counterpart, and its small size, similar to that of a pocket calculator.

Other clones include:
 Monkey See, Monkey Do, which featured a similar casing as that of Simon, except that the buttons were oval-shaped.
 Tiger Electronics' Copy Cat in 1979, re-released with a transparent case in 1988 and using buzzers. 
 Repackaged and released by Sears as Follow Me.
 Released as Copy Cat Jr. in 1981, and as Pocket Repeat by Tandy Computers and Radio Shack.
 Castle Toy's Einstein in 1979.
 Genius, launched in the 80s in Brazil, by Brinquedos Estrela.
 Space Echo by an unknown company.
 Makezine has a DIY version that requires soldering.
 Another DIY version called Electronic Memory Game based on ARM Cortex microcontrollers
 The "Game A" mode of the second game in the Game & Watch handheld series Flagman (Silver, 5th Jun 1980). "Game B" is the same, but doesn't play in a sequence, while the player has a limited time to press the corresponding number lit up.
 R2-D2 Ditto Droid, a Star Wars version featuring R2-D2 sounds and Star Wars-themed graphics by Tiger Electronics, 1997.
 Vtech's Wizard. A side quest in both the SNES and Game Boy Advance versions of Donkey Kong Country 3: Dixie Kong's Double Trouble! that involves freeing creatures called "Banana Birds" using buttons on each system's controller.
 Soviet Elektronika IE-01 Ivolga, nearly an exact visual replica of Simon.
Oddworld games, in which the playable character must progress by completing certain puzzles with a sequence of sounds.

The same gameplay also appears on multi-game handhelds such as:
Tiger Electronics' Brain Warp and Brain Shift games: instead of tones, the game unit issues a recorded voice that calls out colors and numbers in Game 4 - Memory Match. Brain Shift has two memory games, Game 2 (Memory Shift) and Game 3 (Who Shift's It?), that call out colors. 
 Mego Corporation's Fabulous Fred (Game 3, The Memory Game).
 Parker Brothers' Merlin (Game 3, Echo).
 Atari also included a nine-button version of Touch Me as game variations 1-4 (out of 19) on the 1978 Brain Games cartridge for the Atari 2600.
 A fan-made version of Simon was unofficially made available for modded Wiis in 2008.
 A Harry Potter wand released in 2001 called Harry Potter Magic Spell Challenge had Simon gameplay and voice commands: "Wingardium" (to tilt the wand down) and "Leviosa" (to tilt the wand up.).
 Toytronic's GOTCHA!, a similar handheld with 8 buttons instead of 4, produced in a rounded "big" version and a smaller, "pocket" one

Audio
Some versions of the game have tones that play as long as the button is depressed, but others have a constant sound duration. Some versions feature audio themes, such as animals (cat/dog/pig/cow), xylophone, football and space sounds, some of which make the game easier to play. Some versions also have a sound on/off setting, which can make the game harder with only visual cues.

In popular culture
 In the 1987 Stephen King novel The Tommyknockers, a forgotten Simon game left in the back seat of a reporter's car activates itself and, in an accelerated color-switching frenzy, overheats and melts its casing, scorching the seat beneath. The surprised driver then knocks it to the floor before it goes up in flames.
 In the It's Always Sunny In Philadelphia episode "A Very Sunny Christmas", Mac finds the game in his closet and Charlie finds it extremely difficult.
 In an episode of Little Miss Gamer, Simon causes the title character to meet Tom Green and Blackwolf the Dragon Master.
 In the Family Guy episode "Perfect Castaway", Stewie plays with Simon and makes up his own song lyrics to the random key sequences.
 In the American Dad! episode "The One That Got Away", the family becomes addicted to the game, playing it for days without moving.
 In the film 2009 Cloudy with a Chance of Meatballs, Flint, the main character, has to click the correct sequence on a Simon to get into his lab.
 In the 2012 Cougar Town episode "You Can Still Change Your Mind", Ellie uses the game to taunt "Jelly Bean" (Laurie) about her intellectual shortcomings.
 In the 2014 film Paranormal Activity: The Marked Ones, a Simon game is possessed by a demon and works as a mock ouija board.
 In a Robot Chicken sketch, Dick Cheney's heart is replaced with a Simon, in a parody of Iron Man.
 The concept was used as the bonus round in the British game show Ant & Dec's Push the Button, with 5 colours, an extra being purple, and having the name "Dave" (Dynamic Audio-Visual Endgame).
 A minigame resembling Simon appeared in the 2002 video game Sabrina the Teenage Witch: Potion Commotion for the Game Boy Advance.
 A Simon game signed by Baer is on permanent display at the American Computer & Robotics Museum in Bozeman, Montana.
 In the 2014 video game South Park: The Stick of Truth, the player plays Simon to rescue Randy Marsh from an alien probe.
 The quick time event mechanic in the 2005 video game Indigo Prophecy was modeled after the toy.
 Simon was among the bounty stolen by the 18th-century pirates from the sailboat in the 1980 film (and Peter Benchley screenplay) The Island, with the pirates becoming frustrated by not being able to figure out how it worked.
 Simon was used in the 2017 film Monster Trucks to demonstrate training the sea creatures captured by Terravex energy.
 In Despicable Me 3, villain Balthazar Bratt, who has an arsenal of 1980s-themed gadgets, uses Simon as his alarm system.
 In Verónica (2017 Spanish film), the game is seen bleeping by itself.
 In Season 6 of Silicon Valley, Nelson "Big Head" Bighetti spends days playing Simon during working hours at the Business Incubator, and unwittingly internalizes Jian-Yang's SSH key by singing the key's characters along with the lit colors in the game.
 An asymmetric cooperative puzzle game, Keep Talking and Nobody Explodes, from 2015, as one of its puzzles, has a puzzle named "Simon Says", which is based on a concept of Simon (including 4 coloured buttons with flashes and sound), but with extra contrived rules required to make it not easy to solve without the help of other game players.
 In late 2020, the popular game Among Us featured a mini-game loosely based on the design of Simon. However, most players mistakenly referred to it as "Simon Says."
 In the Hart to Hart episode "'Tis the Season to Be Murdered"", the Harts play with a toy resembling Simon while trying new toys they had been given at Mr. Hart's toy company.

ReceptionGames magazine included Simon in their "Top 100 Games of 1980", praising it as "the original electronic 'follow the leader' game" with Simon'' as "a cheerful fellow" who "talks to you in sequences of musical tones and lights".

References

Bibliography
 
 
 US patent for the game's

External links
 Hasbro is the current maker of Simon

Handheld electronic games
Products introduced in 1978
Milton Bradley Company games
Audio games
Android (operating system) games
IOS games
Electronic toys
1970s toys
1980s toys
1990s toys
Memory games
Hasbro